Acinetobacter venetianus is a species of bacteria notable for degrading n-alkanes. It harbours plasmids carrying sequences similar to the Pseudomonas oleovorans  alkane hydroxylase gene alkBFGH. Its potential for bioremediation is an active research topic, particularly its role in the production of the bioemulsifier emulsan. Its type strain is RAG-1T(=ATCC 31012T=CCUG 45561T=LMG 19082T=LUH 3904T=NIPH 1925T).

References

Further reading

External links

Type strain of Acinetobacter venetianus at BacDive -  the Bacterial Diversity Metadatabase

Moraxellaceae
Bacteria described in 1997